FC Midtjylland Academy is the youth academy of FC Midtjylland. The academy consists of youth teams on under-19, under-17 and under-15 basis.

History
FC Midtjylland Academy is the first Danish football academy based on the academy of FC Nantes Atlantique. All the players live at Sportcenter Ikast, where they also train up to nine times a week. Around eight players in every year usually get a contract with the club.

The academy places the social development of its scholars as a priority, and every student follows a regular schooling at either Idrætsefterskolen i Ikast, Ikast Handelsskole or Ikast Gymnasium and takes part in the daily life of the school.

Notable players
Players who have begun their careers at the FC Midtjylland Acedmy include Danish international Simon Kjær and New Zealand international Winston Reid. The academy has developed a number of talents from Midtjylland's linked clubs in Nigeria, including Izunna Uzochukwu, Jude Nworuh, Baba Collins and Adigun Salami. Other Danish players to have attended the academy include Joachim Andersen, Christian Sivebæk, Jesper Juelsgård, Mads Albæk, Erik Sviatchenko and Jonas Lössl.

External links
FC Midtjylland Academy at FC Midtjylland's website

Academy
Midtjylland Academy
Midtjylland Academy
Midtjylland Academy